Rail transport in South Korea is a part of the transport network in South Korea and an important mode of the conveyance of people and goods, though railways play a secondary role compared to the road network. In 2018, rails carried 11.5 percent of all traffic in South Korea134.8million passengers and 30.9milliontonnes of freightwith roads carrying 88.3 percent.

Passenger and freight services are primarily provided by the Korea Railroad Corporation, branded as Korail, a state-owned enterprise under the Ministry of Land, Infrastructure and Transport, although some rail lines and services, including high-speed intercity rails and metropolitan rapid transit, are operated by private companies. The Korea National Railway (formerly the Korea Rail Network Authority), another state company under the Transport Ministry, is responsible for constructing and maintaining the railway infrastructure, with Korail and other rail operators paying track access charges to Korea National Railway. Both Korail and Korea National Railway were created in 2004–2005 after the government decided to split the state-owned Korean National Railroad.

History

Korean Empire and Partition 

Rail transport in Korea began in the late 19th century. On March 19, 1896, the late Joseon Dynasty that ruled Korea awarded American engineer James R. Morse a concession to build a railway between Seoul and Chemulpo (today Incheon), while on July 4, the French company Compagnie de Fives - Lille represented by Antoine Grille received another concession to connect Seoul and Wonsan by rail, later modified to run from Seoul to Uiju as the Gyeongui Line instead. Construction on the Chemulpo line begun on March 22, 1897, under the management of American businessmen Henry Collbran and Harry Bostwick on behalf of James Morse, but after Morse was unable to secure the necessary funding, he sold the concession to a Japanese company headed by Shibusawa Eiichi; the sale went into effect on December 31, 1898. The line was inaugurated on September 18, 1899, between Chemulpo and Yeongdeungpo on the south bank of the Han River, with the section to Seoul opening on July 9, 1900, after the construction of a bridge across the river. Additionally, on February 1, 1898, the Seoul Electric Company (today Korea Electric Power Corporation) was founded to manage electricity generation in Seoul, as well as to build tram lines in the city. The first tram line was opened on May 20, 1899 between Seodaemun and Dongdaemun (today two districts of Seoul), before the Seoul-Chemulpo railway, becoming the first railroad on the Korean Peninsula. The French surrendered their concession in 1899 for the Gyeongui Line having been unable to raise the capital necessary to fund construction, with the Korean government in turn founding the Northwest Railway Bureau and agreeing to finance building the rail to Uiju with French support. On May 8, 1902, construction started on this line under the name Northwestern Railway, from Seoul to Uiju through Kaesong and Pyongyang, with completion in 1905 under the supervision of the Japanese military.

Japan's influence on railway development in Korea begun even before Japan's occupation of Korea in 1910. On September 8, 1898, the Korean government awarded a concession to connect Seoul and Busan by rail to a Japanese company. The Japanese government in 1901 founded the Seoul‑Busan Railway Corporation to oversee construction, however, due to delays, the Japanese government took direct control of the project in 1903. Construction lasted from August 21, 1901 to December 27, 1904, with operations beginning on January 1, 1905; in the early years, the rail trip between Seoul and Busan took almost 14 hours. This and other railway lines were constructed by Japanese companies and the Japanese military to facilitate Japanese troop movements across the Korean peninsula during the Russo-Japanese War in 1904–1905 and Japan's subsequent expansion into Manchuria before and during World War II. Roadways played a secondary role to railways in Japan's military plans.

To manage the rail infrastructure and services, on July 6, 1906, the Japanese created the Railway Management Bureau under the administration of the Japanese Resident-General of Korea. On September 1, 1906, the Railway Management Bureau was merged with the Temporary Military Railway of the Imperial Japanese Army and the Gyeongbu Railwayby then the only privately owned railway operator in Koreato create the National Railway Administration, renamed the Korea Railway Administration on December 16, 1909. After the Japanese annexed Korea in 1910, on October 1, the administration became the Railway Bureau of the Government-General of Korea. This operated for the first few years as an agency under the direct control of the Governor-General's secretariat, then from July 31, 1917 to March 31, 1925 under the management from the South Manchuria Railway, finally becoming and independent agency on April 1, 1925 as the Chōsen Government Railway.

Following World War II and during the divided occupation of Korea, from September 14, 1945, to September 7, 1948, the United States Army Military Government in Korea operated all railroads in Korea. A state-owned company was established on September 7, 1948, to take over operating the railways from the American military. The railroad network was badly damaged during the Korean War, but it was later rebuilt and improved by USATC.

South Korea 

Between 1948 and 1963, the Korean government exercised direct control over the country's railways. To provide for more independent operations, on September 1, 1963, the government established the Korea National Railroad, an independent agency of the Ministry of Transportation. This agency was in charge of all rails throughout the 1970s, 1980s, and 1990s, and continued electrifying and double-tracking heavily used tracks.

However, government investment in railways continued to decline as a share of total investment in transportation modes, from 61 percent of all investment during the first five-year plan of 1962–1966 to 10 percent during the sixth five-year plan of 1987–1991. Roads and highways were the primary beneficiaries of this decline.

Railroads in the 1980s were useful primarily in the transportation of freight, and they were important for passenger traffic around Seoul and in the heavily traveled corridor linking the capital with the southern port of Busan. Although the railroad system grew little during the 1980s, rail improvementsthe increased electrification of tracks, replacement of older tracks, and the addition of rolling stockallowed rail traffic to boom. Some of the busiest lines south of Seoul linking the capital with Busan and Mokpo had three or four tracks. The 1980s also saw the introduction of high-speed trains connecting Seoul with Busan, Jeonju, Mokpo, and Gyeongju. The famous "Blue Train" (Saemaul-ho) between Seoul and Busan (via Daejeon and Daegu) took only four hours and fifty minutes and offered two classes of service: first class and special.

Rapid transit 

While investment in railroads between cities languished in the 1960s–1980s, railroads in cities continued to receive attention. Announced in 1965, the first line of the Seoul Metropolitan Subway, the first rapid transit system in South Korea, opened in 1974. Lines 2–4 followed in subsequent years as part of the first phase of construction, but construction on lines 5–8the second phasewas postponed in the 1980s and only started in the 1990s. Of the four planned lines in phase three, only line 9 was built, partly through a public-private partnership. As of 2021, the lines are operated by Seoul Metro, formed through the merger of Seoul Metro Corporation and Seoul Metropolitan Rapid Transit Corporation in 2017. Outside of Seoul, subways opened in Busan in 1985, Daegu in 1997, Incheon in 1999, Gwangju in 2004 and Daejeon in 2006.

KTX 

The government decided to invest in Korea's first high-speed rail to ease traffic congestion between Seoul and Busan. With more than two-thirds of the country's population, passenger traffic, and freight traffic concentrated in the corridor connecting the two citiesand a new expressway built in the 1970s failing to solve traffic problemsseveral studies commissioned by the government in the 1970s proposed building a high-speed railroad. Construction became a priority in the 1980s, when it was included in the 1982–1986 five-year plan.

Planning started before the government decided on the rolling stock. In 1991, Korea sent a request for proposals to Japan, France and Germany, all countries with successful high-speed railways with the Shinkansen, TGV and ICE, respectively. While initially favoring the Japanese Shinkansen, Korea selected the TGV as its preferred rolling stock as the Japanese were hesitant to transfer their technological know-how to the Koreans, with the French willing to do so. The French also agreed that after building the first few train sets in France, the rest would be built in Korea with involvement from Korean companies.

In March 1992, the government created the Korea High Speed Rail Construction Authority to oversee the construction of the Gyeongbu High Speed Railway (Gyeongbu HSR). Construction started on June 30, 1992, before choosing the vehicle. The initial completion goal was 1998; lack of experience, frequent redesign, difficulties in purchasing land, and the IMF crisis delayed the entire project. As a result, Korea Train Express (KTX) service began April 1, 2004. Since its opening in 2004, the high-speed rail service has halved the demand for air transport on this corridor which used to be one of the busiest direct air routes in the world.

Reform and private rail companies 

Private investment in railways in South Korea before the mid-1990s was nominal. Between 1968–1994, only 12 rail projects with a total combined cost of US$660 million received private investment, but the operation and management of all remained in government hands. In 1994, to encourage private investment in infrastructure projects through public-private partnerships, the South Korean parliament adopted the Promotion of Private Capital in Social Overhead Capital Investment Act, followed in 1998 by the Act on Private Participation in Infrastructure and in 2005 the Act on Public-Private Partnership in Infrastructure given the limited impact of the first law. PPPs can take the form of build–operate–transfer, build-lease-transfer, and build-own-operate delivery models and can be controlled by either the national or local governments. After the 1997 Asian financial crisis, several government-driven railroad construction projects were reviewed, postponed, redesigned, revoked or turned into build-operate-transfer projects. Several companies, including Macquarie Group, Shinhan Bank and Hyundai, have participated in the projects. Notably, AREX and Seoul Metro 9 are in operation, with the Seohae Line due to open in January 2023. However, due to the continuing deficit, most shares of Airport Express Co. were taken over by Korail. Several private railroads, such as Shinbundang Line, BGLRT, and Everline, have begun service as well.

The government had been aiming to improve the governance of Korean railways since the 1980s. Initially, the transportation ministry aimed to regain full control over the Korean National Railroad, which operated as an independent government agency, and re-establish it as a government-owned corporation. These efforts petered out in 1995, when government instead granted increased autonomy to KNR. In 1999, the division of KNR responsible for railway construction was merged with the Korea High Speed Rail Construction Authority, which was overseeing the building of the Gyeongbu HSR. A few years later, the government decided to split the national railroad into separate companies for operation and construction. As a result, after building Gyeongbu HSR, the Korean National Railroad was split into Korail (established in January 2004) and Korea Rail Network Authority (established in January 2005 and renamed to Korea National Railway in September 2020), the former managing operation and the latter maintaining tracks. This allowed open access in the Korean railway system. KR was constituted with old KNR infrastructure assets, and several debts due to construction of railway lines were transferred.

Railway reform and the introduction of private rail companies into Korea's network continued into the 2010s. In 2012, the then-Ministry of Land, Transport and Maritime Affairs called for bids to operate high-speed trains for 15 years on the Seoul–Busan and Seoul–Mokpo lines. The ministry's goal was to end the state-owned Korail's monopoly and create competition for the state-run KTX trains, hoping to increase the quality of service and decrease fares. SR Corporation, founded in 2014, won the concession to operate the trains; though Korail owns 41 percent of its shares, a teachers' pension fund and two Korean banks own a combined 59 percent of shares, with SR thus operating independently from the government and Korail. SR's high-speed rail services were launched from Seoul's Suseo station in 2016, but within a few months, the ministry started studying the possibility of merging Korail and SR.

Reconnection with North Korea 
On November 30, 2018, 30 officials from North and South Korea began an 18-day survey in both Koreas to connect the Korean railroads. The survey, which had previously been obstructed by the Korean Demilitarized Zone's (DMZ) "frontline" guard posts and landmines located at the DMZ's Arrowhead Hill, consists of a 400-kilometre (248-mile) railroad section between Kaesong and Sinuiju that cuts through the North's central region and northeastern coast. The railway survey, which involved the inspection of the Gyeongui Line, concluded on December 5, 2018. On December 8, 2018, an inter-Korean survey began in both Koreas for the Donghae Line. On December 13, 2018, it was announced that the groundbreaking ceremony to symbolize the reconnection of the roads and railways in both Koreas will be held on December 26, 2018 in Kaesong. On December 17, 2018, the latest inter-Korean railway survey, which involved an  rail from Kumgangsan near the inter-Korean border to the Tumen River bordering Russia in the east, was completed. A potential threat to the groundbreaking ceremony emerged after it was revealed that the North Korean railway was in poor condition. On December 21, 2018, however, the United States agreed to no longer obstruct plans by both Koreas to hold a groundbreaking ceremony. On December 26, 2018, a groundbreaking ceremony was held in the North Korean city of Kaesong to reconnect railroads and roads between both North and South Korea. However, it was acknowledged that these reconnected North Korean railroads needed more inspection and construction in order to be active, due to deterioration.

Traffic volume

Railway lines 
The principal and most used railway line is the Gyeongbu Line (경부선), which connects Seoul, the capital and largest city, with Busan, the country's second largest city and largest seaport; the second is the Honam Line (호남선), which branches off the Gyeongbu Line at Daejeon and ends at Gwangju or Mokpo.

The following is a table of major railway lines in South Korea:

There is no railway service on Jeju Island.

Services 

Frequent service is provided on most routes, with trains every 15–60 minutes connecting Seoul to all major South Korean cities.

High-speed rail services 

A high-speed railroad by the name of the Korea Train Express (KTX) is in service between Seoul, Busan, Yeosu, Jinju, Donghae, Gangneung and Mokpo. The railway uses French TGV/LGV technology. Service started on April 1, 2004, using the completed high-speed line sections and using upgraded conventional lines. Another section of high-speed line sped up Seoul-Busan services from November 1, 2010. Additional services on new routes will be introduced to Masan on the Gyeongjeon Line on December 15, 2010, and to Yeosu on the Jeolla Line in April 2011. A second operator of high speed trains, SRT, operates KTX style trains from southern Seoul's Suseo Terminal (close to the Gangnam neighborhood) to both Busan and Mokpo.

 KTX, the high-speed railway system, takes passengers from downtown Seoul to downtown Busan faster than an airplane (including check-in time), makes fewer stops and is more expensive than other trains.
 KTX-Eum is higher-speed railway system with maximum speed . It offers superior seats and standard seats.
 SRT, another high-speed railway system, operated by private company called "SR". It connects Gangnam of Seoul and Busan, Mokpo

Conventional rail services 

 ITX, semi-fast trains, operates on selected lines:
 ITX-Cheongchun (ITX-청춘) operates between Yongsan and Chuncheon via Cheongnyangni.
 ITX-Saemaul (ITX-새마을, named after its predecessor), replaced regular Saemaul-ho service on electrified lines, provides express service on Gyeongbu, Honam, Gyeongjeon, Jeolla, and Jungang Line.
 Mugunghwa-ho (무궁화호, "Rose of Sharon") service, which is the most popular, stops at most stations, and offers a mixture of reserved and unreserved seating.
 Nuriro (누리로), which will replace mid-long distance Mugunghwa service in selected routes. Currently operates Seoul-Sinchang route and other lines.

Excursion luxury cruise train 

There is currently one all-sleeper cruise train service in South Korea, operated by Korail - Rail Cruise Haerang (레일크루즈 해랑). Rail Cruise Haerang commenced operation in 2008. Currently the train operates itineraries which are curated monthly along three routes - to southeastern Korea, to southwestern Korea and a Grand Tour. The detail of travel plans changes seasonally and annually, and there are special travel plans available in certain periods. Eiji Mitooka indirectly implied that he referred to this train for the design of Seven Stars in Kyushu.

The cost per person is here (For Deluxe and Suite room, two-people. For Family room, three-people.) :

Rapid transit 

South Korea's six largest cities—Seoul, Busan, Daegu, Gwangju, Daejeon and Incheon—all have subway systems.

Seoul Metropolitan Subway is the oldest system in the country, with the Seoul Station-Cheongnyangni section of Line 1 opening in 1974.

Rolling stock 

The first locomotives used in Korea were steam locomotives. The locomotives used on the Gyeongin Railway when it opened on September 18, 1899 were four 2-6-0T steam tank engines built by the American Brooks Locomotive Works. They were delivered to Korea disassembled on June 17, 1899, and assembled at a factory in Incheon. Numbered 1–4, they eventually became the Chōsen Government Railway's Mogai-class locomotives. Steam locomotives remained the dominant motive power of South Korea's railways until the 1950s and the last steam engine was retired on August 31, 1967.

Diesel engines were introduced in 1955. The first diesel engines were four EMD SW8 (later classified as Korail Class 2000) switcher locomotives manufactured in the United States by General Motors Electro-Motive Division and General Motors Diesel, donated to the Korean railways by United Nations Command in March 1955. These four locomotives were among 35 locomotives dispatched to Korea to be used by United Nations and American forces during the Korean War due to the dearth of Korean railroad equipment; they arrived on Korean soil on July 15, 1951.

The first electric locomotives, the Korail Class 8000, were introduced the same year the electrification of railway lines kicked off in 1972. The first 8000 trains were assembled by the 50 C/S Groupconsisting of ACEC, AEG-Telefunken, Alsthom, Brown Boveri, MTE, and Siemensin Belgium and arrived in Korea on March 7, 1972. After a successful test run on a section of the Taebaek Line on June 9, it entered into regular service on June 20, 1973 on the Jungang Line. Initially, locomotives were mostly imported from abroad, but domestic manufacturing of electric engines began in 1976 and diesel engines in 1980.

As of 2019, Korean rail companies owned 16,180 rail vehicles, a decrease from the high of 20,100 in 1993. Of these, 1530 were KTX and 100 SR Corporation high-speed vehicles, and 254 were diesel and 175 electric locomotives. 2913 were multiple units, with 2792 being electric multiple units. The majority of all rail vehicles, 10,359 units, were railroad cars. When it came to the average age of rail vehicles, it ranged from an average of 7 years for certain higher-speed electric multiple units to 10 and 19 years for electric and diesel locomotives, respectively, to 23 years for diesel multiple units.

International service 

 North Korea: Same gauge but not generally available. Until the division of Korea following the end of the Second World War, the Gyeongui Line and Gyeongwon Line extended into what is now North Korea. The Gyeongui Line connected Seoul to Kaesong, Pyongyang, and Sinuiju on the Chinese border, while the Gyeongwon Line served Wonsan on the east coast. Another line—the Geumgangsan Line—connected the town of Cheorwon, now on the border of North and South Korea, on the Gyeongwon Line, to Mt. Geumgang, now in the North.

The Gyeongui Line is one of two lines whose southern and northern halves are now being reconnected, the other being the Donghae Bukbu Line. On 17 May 2007, two test trains ran on the reconnected lines: one on the west line from Munsan to Kaesong; the second on the east from Jejin to Kumgang.

In December 2007, regular freight service started on the Gyeongui line, from South Korea into the Kaesong Industrial Park in the north. The service has been underused: As reported in October 2008, on 150 out of 163 return trips that had been done so far, the train carried no cargo. The amount of cargo carried over this period had been merely . This absence of interest in the service has been explained by the customers' (companies operating in Kaesong) preference for road transport. In November 2008, North Korea shut down the link. On 26 June 2018 the two Koreas agreed to reconnect the Gyeongui Line and the Donghae Bukbu Line again.

A Trans-Korean Main Line, spanning North Korea and connecting to Russian Railways, is planned.

 Japan: There's no railroad connection between South Korea and Japan. But Korail and JR West have a joint rail pass which includes discounted KTX and Shinkansen tickets with a Busan-Shimonoseki/Fukuoka ferry ticket. A Korean Strait undersea tunnel has been proposed, but the project has not progressed beyond initial planning as studies in the early 2010s showed the development not to be economical.

Timeline

2008 
 Map of 2015 vision

2018 
 A groundbreaking ceremony is held to symbolize to reconnection of the North and South Korea railroads.

See also 

 Rail transport in North Korea
 Transport in South Korea
 The Korea Transport Institute

References

Bibliography